My Mother Is Guilty (Spanish: Mi madre es culpable) is a 1960 Mexican drama film directed by Julián Soler and starring Marga López, Carlos Baena and Domingo Soler.

The film's sets were designed by Jesús Bracho.

Cast
 Marga López as Consuelo Moreno de Manterola  
 Carlos Baena as Javier Manterola  
 Domingo Soler as Ángel Guzmán  
 Miguel Ángel Ferriz as Padre Roberto Romero  
 Luis Beristáin as Luis Alcazar  
 Francisco Jambrina as Arturo González  
 Guillermo Orea as Álvaro de la Fuente  
 Dolores Camarillo as Carmen, sirvienta  
 Antonio Raxel as Doctor Alberto Amador  
 Herbert Wallace as Carlitos 
 Beatriz Aguirre as Lucía Arellano 
 Luis Spota as Locutor 
 Miguel Arenas as Rabino Mauricio Rosenthal  
 Daniel Arroyo as Profesor de la Facultad 
 Antonio Bravo as Dr. Ramos  
 Sara Cabrera as Custodia carcel  
 Jorge Casanova as Doctor  
 Enrique García Álvarez as Profesor de la facultad  
 Pepita González as Carcelera 
 Jesús Gómez  
 Carlos Hennings as Empleado en hospital 
 Regino Herrera as Hombre en derrumbe  
 Velia Lupercio as Espectadora estudio 
 José Antonio Marros as Espectador estudio 
 Magda Monzón as Espectadora en estudio  
 Silvia Suárez as Espectadora en silla de ruedas 
 Armando Velasco as Sacerdote

References

Bibliography 
 Emilio García Riera. Historia documental del cine mexicano: 1959–1960. Universidad de Guadalajara, 1994.

External links 
 

1960 films
1960 drama films
Mexican drama films
1960s Spanish-language films
Films directed by Julián Soler
1960s Mexican films